Oh! My Three Guys is a 1994 Hong Kong comedy drama film directed by Derek Chiu and starring Eric Kot, Lau Ching-wan and Dayo Wong. The film tells the story of three gay young men portrayed by Kot, Lau and Wong.

Plot
Good friends Kau, Hoi and Fa are homosexual men. Hoi works in an advertising firm while Kau and Fa have not found a suitable job yet. Hoi's new female colleague Mei became interested in him. When Mei found out that Hoi was gay, she did not discriminate him and was determined to help him return to normal. At that time, Kau was infected with AIDS and one time during a TV interview, he suddenly fell unconscious. Hoi and Fa was eager to make the last days of Kau happy, they organized a masquerade for him. After the masquerade, Kau committed suicide and Hoi quit his job after his homosexual identity was exposed.

Cast
Eric Kot as Kau Ku-neung
Lau Ching-wan as Ching Yu-hoi
Dayo Wong as Fa
Jacklyn Wu as Fok Mei
Charine Chan as Bitchy Air Hostess
Noel Chik as Nancy
Simon Lui as Donald
Joseph Cheng as Toby
Kenneth Chan as Mike
Anthony Wong as Best Actor Winner
Manfred Wong as Head Writer
Yip Hon-leung as Mr. Chan
Jerry Koo
Nelson Cheung
Wong Yat-fei as Chan Yiu-cho
Wong Wa-wo
John Cheung as Mr. Ho Yun-cheung

Box office
The film grossed HK$9,458,839 at the Hong Kong box office during its theatrical run from 1 December 1994 to 20 January 1995 in Hong Kong.

External links

Oh! My Three Guys at Hong Kong Cinemagic

Oh! My Three Guys Review at LoveHKFilm.com

1994 films
1994 comedy-drama films
Hong Kong comedy-drama films
Hong Kong LGBT-related films
1990s Cantonese-language films
Golden Harvest films
Films set in Hong Kong
Films shot in Hong Kong
LGBT-related comedy-drama films
1994 LGBT-related films
Regal Entertainment films
1990s Hong Kong films